Leucophlebia frederkingi is a moth of the family Sphingidae. It is known from Thailand.

References

Leucophlebia
Moths described in 2003